The Point Pleasant Register is a newspaper in Point Pleasant, West Virginia.  Circulation is limited to Mason County and nearby areas.  The newspaper was founded by George W. Tippett as the Weekly Register in 1862, many years before becoming a daily publication under the title of the Daily Register, and finally the Point Pleasant Register.

Today, the newspaper follows the unusual schedule of publishing Tuesday-Friday mornings, with a "weekend" edition delivered at mid-day on Saturday.

In recent years, the Register primarily covers local events, with broader news coverage provided by the Huntington Herald-Dispatch and the Charleston Gazette-Mail, which circulate widely throughout the county.

The paper was formerly owned by Heartland Publications. In 2012 Versa merged Ohio Community Media, the former Freedom papers it had acquired, Impressions Media, and Heartland Publications into a new company, Civitas Media. Civitas Media sold the Register to AIM Media Midwest in 2017.

References

External links

Newspapers published in West Virginia
Point Pleasant, West Virginia